Janine Elizabeth Cunningham (born 23 May 1983), better known as Jah9, is a Jamaican singer and also a yoga teacher.

Biography 
Jah9 was born in Montego Bay in Saint James, Jamaica. Her father was a Baptist minister and her mother was a teacher and social worker. She spent much of her childhood in Falmouth, Trelawny. In 1991 the family moved to Kingston. After a period at the university she commenced realizing her musical passion. Her music is often described as "jazz on dub", because her singing voice is influenced by Nina Simone and Billie Holiday, partly combined with the dancehall sound of Sizzla and the more potent dub rhythms similar to those of Augustus Pablo. In 2013 her first album New Name appeared. She has recorded three albums for VP Records including New Name (2013), 9 (2016) and the recently released Note to Self on March 13, 2020.

Discography

Albums 
  New Name  (2013)
 ‘’9’’ (2016)
 ‘’Mad Professor Meets Jah9 - In The Midst Of The Storm’’ (2017)
 ‘’Feelings‘’ (2018)(mini-album, vinyl only)
 ‘’Note To Self’’ (2020)

References

1983 births
Living people
Dub musicians
21st-century Jamaican women singers
People from Montego Bay
VP Records artists